Chiayi County (Mandarin pinyin: Jiāyì xiàn; Hokkien POJ: Ka-gī-koān) is a county in the titular Taiwan Province of the Republic of China. Located in southwestern Taiwan surrounding but not including Chiayi City, it is the sixth largest county in the island of Taiwan.

Name
The former Chinese placename was Tsu-lo-san, a representation of the original Formosan-language name Tirosen. A shortened version, Tsulo, was then used to name Tsulo County, which originally covered the underdeveloped northern two-thirds of the island. In 1704, the county seat was moved to Tsulosan, the site of modern-day Chiayi City. Following the 1723 Zhu Yigui rebellion, the county was reduced in size. In 1787, the county and city were renamed Chiayi by the Qianlong Emperor to acknowledge the citizens' loyalty during the Lin Shuangwen rebellion.

History

Qing dynasty
Chiayi County was originally part of Zhuluo County during the Qing dynasty. It was given its modern name by the Qianlong Emperor after the Lin Shuangwen rebellion  in 1788 for its role in resisting the rebels.

Empire of Japan
From 1920, during the Japanese rule of Taiwan, the area of Tainan Prefecture covered modern-day Chiayi County, Chiayi City, Tainan and Yunlin County.

Republic of China
After the handover of Taiwan from Japan to the Republic of China on 25 October 1945, the area of present-day Chiayi County was administered under Tainan County. In October 1950, Chiayi County was established as a county of Taiwan Province. Chiayi City was designated as the county seat.

In July 1982, Chiayi City was upgraded to a provincial city, thus in December 1981, Chiayi County government relocated the county seat to Dongshiliao Farm in Taibao Township.

In March 1989, Wufong Township was renamed Alishan Township. In July 1991, Taibao Township was reorganized as Taibao City. In November 1991, Chiayi County government relocated the county seat from Dongshiliao Farm to Hsiangho New Village in Taibao City. Puzi Township was reorganized as a county-administered city in September 1992.

Geography
Chiayi County borders Mount Yu to the east, Taiwan Strait to the west, Tainan City to the south and Yunlin County to the north. Chiayi County is located along the Tropic of Cancer.

Administration

Chiayi County is divided into 2 cities, 2 urban townships, 13 rural townships and 1 mountain indigenous township. Taibao City is the seat of Chiayi County and is home to Chiayi County Government. The Chiayi County Council is however located in Puzi City. Weng Chang-liang of the Democratic Progressive Party is the incumbent Magistrate of Chiayi County.

Color indicates statutory language status of the Formosan language in the respective subdivision.

Demographics

The current population of Chiayi County as of May 2022 is 490,423 people. The county has been experiencing a population decline since 2009 due to higher migration out of the county and a higher death rate than birth rate. In 2013, the birthrate in the county was 5.89, lower than the average in Taiwan of 8.91, and the second lowest after Keelung.

Education

Chiayi County is home to the government-owned National Chung Cheng University and National Chiayi University. Private universities and colleges including Chang Gung University of Science and Technology, Nanhua University, Toko University and WuFeng University. Education-related affairs in the county is managed by the Educational Department of Chiayi County Government.

Economy
Over the past 20 years, Chiayi County had often been left out in the regional economic development due to its less strategic location, lack of infrastructure and appropriate industrial land to attract manufacturers to set up factories in the area. All of the existing industrial parks in the county were built before 1981. Class 2 and class 3 industries have been developing slowly throughout Chiayi, thus the economic development is sluggish as well, resulting in slow urban development.

Three industrial parks named the Dapumei Industrial Park, Ma Chou Hou Industrial Park and Budai Intelligent Industrial Park are currently under planning in the county. Industrial parks in the neighboring counties and cities also contributed to the difficulty of industrial developments in Chiayi County.

Energy
The Zengwen Hydroelectric Plant and Chiahui Gas-Fired Power Plant boasted the total national grid capacity of 50 MW and 670 MW respectively. Both of the power plants are located in the county.

Incinerator in the county is Lutsao Refuse Incineration Plant.

Tourist attractions

Museums
Notable museums, cultural centers and monuments in Chiayi County are the Dongshi Natural Ecological Exhibition Center, Mei-Ling Fine Arts Museum, National Radio Museum, Ping Huang Coffee Museum, Southern Branch of the National Palace Museum, Xikou Township Cultural Life Center and Tropic of Cancer Monument.

Natural
Bordered by mountains on one side and sea on the other side, Chiayi County holds three major national parks, which are Alishan National Scenic Area, Southwest Coast National Scenic Area and Siraya National Scenic Area, each represents a unique view of nature's wonders, from mountains, plains to ocean views. It also houses the Chukou Nature Center,
Haomeiliao Wetland and Meishan Park.

Dams
Renyitan Dam and Zengwen Dam are located in the county.

Buildings
The county houses the Dongshi Fisherman's Wharf, Chiayi Performing Arts Center and High-Heel Wedding Church.

Transportation

Air
Chiayi County is served by Chiayi Airport, located at the junction of Shuishang Township, Taibao City and neighboring Chiayi City.

Rail
Taiwan High Speed Rail stops at Chiayi Station in Taibao City. Taiwan Railways Administration stations include the Dalin Station, Minxiong Station, Nanjing Station and Shuishang Station. The Alishan Forest Railway leads to Alishan National Scenic Area, with stations in Zhuqi Township, Meishan Township and Alishan Township.

Water
Budai Harbor in Budai Township provides ferry services to Magong City, Penghu.

Relative location

References

External links

 Chiayi County Government Garden City 
 https://web.archive.org/web/20100305233542/http://www.ccu.edu.tw/eng/e-index.php